Bejaranoa is a genus of South American flowering plants in the family Asteraceae.

 Species
 Bejaranoa balansae (Hieron.) R.M.King & H.Rob.	 - Bolivia, Paraguay; type species;  syn. Eupatorium balansae Hieron.
 Bejaranoa semistriata (Sch.Bip. ex Baker) R.M.King & H.Rob. - Brazil

References

Flora of South America
Asteraceae genera
Eupatorieae